Emily Rose may refer to:
 Emily Rose (actress) (born 1981), American television actress/voice actress
 The Exorcism of Emily Rose, a 2005 supernatural horror crime film about demonic possession, loosely based on the story of Anneliese Michel (1952–1976).

See also 
 Emily Rosa (born 1987), American skeptic and medical researcher

Rose, Emily